George Henry Hutchinson (31 October 1929 – 1996) was an English professional footballer who played for Huddersfield Town, Sheffield United, Tottenham Hotspur, Guildford City, Leeds United, Halifax Town and Skegness Town. He served in the RAF during national service and was stationed at Ballykelly in Northern Ireland and RAF Cosford and was a PTI. He also played for the RAF team. Hutchinson was born in Allerton Bywater, West Riding of Yorkshire, the son of a miner who worked at the local colliery.

References

1929 births
1996 deaths
People from Allerton Bywater
Footballers from Yorkshire
English footballers
Association football midfielders
Huddersfield Town A.F.C. players
Sheffield United F.C. players
Tottenham Hotspur F.C. players
Guildford City F.C. players
Leeds United F.C. players
Halifax Town A.F.C. players
Skegness Town A.F.C. players
English Football League players
Royal Air Force Physical Training instructors